The House of Cirksena was the name of the ruling family of Ostfriesland. They descended from a line of East Frisian chieftains from Greetsiel.

East Frisia 
In 1439, in the wake of clashes between different lines of chieftains, the town of Emden was first placed by Hamburg under direct rule and then, in 1453, given to the Cirksena. The family administered and ruled the town until 1595.

The Cirksena gained strength and succeeded the chieftain line of the tom Broks, after their opponent Focko Ukena was defeated and expelled by several allied chieftains, led by Edzard Cirksena. Ulrich Cirksena (d. 1466) was elevated to the rank of imperial count by Emperor Frederick III and enfeoffed with the Imperial County of East Frisia.

The most important ruler from the House of Cirksena was Edzard the Great (1462–1528), under whose leadership the Imperial County of East Frisia reached its greatest extent. During his reign, the Reformation spread throughout East Frisia. In 1654, the Cirksena were elevated to princes by the emperor. Charles Edzard, the last ruler from the House of Cirksena, died without issue during the night of 25/26 May 1744 (reportedly from a glass of buttermilk, which he is said to have drunk after a hunt). Immediately thereafter, the state was taken over by Frederick the Great.

Rietberg 
The Cirksena provided the rulers of the County of Rietberg from 1581 to 1699. This initially happened as a personal union with East Frisia, after Count Enno III had married Rietberg's daughter-heir, Walburg von Rietberg. In the Treaty of Berum (1600), however, he ceded the County of Rietberg to his daughters.

In 1601, Enno's brother, Count John III, married his niece, Sabina Catherine, Enno's daughter and heiress of Rietberg, with papal dispensation. Both were converted to Catholicism and so founded the Catholic branch line of the House of Cirksena. The last male descendant of the House of East Frisia in Rietberg, Count Ferdinand Maximilian, died in 1687. His heiress, Maria Ernestine Francisca, married Maximilian Ulrich von Kaunitz in 1699.

Coat of arms 

The coat of arms of the family of Cirksena displays a crowned, golden harpy (or angel) on a black field. This motif appears in a variety of successor coats of arms; for example, in the final comital coat of arms of East Frisia, which Count Rudolf Christian adopted in 1625. Here, the harpy is in the upper left of the shield. This coat of arms is still used today as the emblem of East Frisia.

The upper half of Emden's coat of arms also depicts the Cirksena harpy. Until the Emden Revolution in 1595, the Cirksena resided in the town of Emden. Even the Dutch town of Delfzijl opposite Emden incorporated the Cirksena coat of arms into its own. This goes back to the rule of Edzard the Great in Groningerland. Likewise, the harpy is part of the  coat of arms of Aurich district, albeit in a different colour, something which also goes back to the Cirksena. Even the present-day municipality of Krummhörn, in which the ancestral homeland of the Cirksena lay, has the family's coat of arms in its municipal shield.

After the Cirksena had taken over the reins of power in the County of Rietberg, their emblem was also found in Rietberg's coat of arms, between the coat of arms of the old ruling family and that of the Harlingerland. It was later supplemented by the Kaunitz family's coat of arms.

Through the link between East Frisia and Rietberg, the Cirksena harpy is still part of the coat of arms of the Principality of Liechtenstein, albeit in the reverse colours (black and gold), at the bottom right (heraldic: bottom left). Gundakar of Liechtenstein had married Agnes Cirksena, the second daughter of Count Enno III and Walburgis of Rietberg, and had a claim to Rietberg as a result.

Origin of the name
The name Cirksena is of Frisian origin and is still a widespread family name in East Frisia today. It probably goes back to the old forename Tzirk (Cirk). Enno Attena took over the respectable name on the occasion of his marriage to the daughter-heir, Gela Syardsna of Manslagt.

Genealogy 

Syert/Syrt/Syrtatus, Captain of Norden, +after 1255; m. NN Aldersna; They had issue:
A1. Enno, +after 1280; m. N van Norden
 B1. Sitat, Captain of Norden, +after 1310

   C1. Enno, Captain of Norden, +after 1340

     D1. Sitat (?), +after 1400; m. Frouwa N (+after 1437)
     D2. a daughter; m. Hylo Atena, Captain of Norden (+after 1367)
     D3. a daughter; m. Affo Beninga van Pirsum, heer van Bersum (+1402)
     D4. a daughter
     D5. Frouwa, +after 1437

 B2. Idzerd, Captain of Appingen, +after 1312; m. Etta van Visquard (+after 
      1312)
  C1. Enno, Captain of Appingen, +after 1350; m. Adda van Groothusen
  D1. Etta; m. Hera Attena, heer van Dornum (+after 1410)
  D2. Idzerd, Captain of Appingen, +1406; 1m: Doda ten Book, dau.of Keno 
      Hilmersna; 2m: N.von Engena (?)
   E1. Enno
   E2. Imel, Captain of Eilsum, +after 1404
   F1. Sibrand, Captain of Eilsum, +4.4.1465
   E3. Haro, +after 1408
   E4. Enno, Captain of Norden, Greetsiel, Berva and Pilsum, +ca 1450; 1m: 
       Gela Beningna von Manslagt (+after 1429); 2m: Ellen Sytzena, dau.of 
       Affo Beninga van Pilsum, heer van Bersum en Tiadeke (+1450), widow of 
       Ewo van Westerhusen
    F1. [1m.] Frouwa; 1m: Sibet Attena (+1433); 2m: Eppo Gokkinga 
            (+after 1437)
    F2. Edzard, Judge of Frisia, +after 1441; 1m: Moeder Ennosna 
        (+1438); 2m: Frouwe, dau.of Ewo von Westerhusen and Ellen Sytzena
    F3. Ulrich I, Statolder of Ostfriesland (1454–64), 1st Graf von 
        Ostfriesland (1464–66), +27.9.1466; 1m: Foelke van Esens (+1452); 
        2m: 1453 Theda Ukena, dau.of Uko van Oldersum (*ca 1434,+17.9.1494)
    G1. [2m.] Hebe, *18.11.1457, +1476/78; m. Gf Erich I von Schaumburg- 
        Pinneberg (*1420, +24/25.3.1492)
    G2. Gela, *1458, +1497
    G3. Enno I, Graf von Ostfriesland (1466–91), *1.6.1460,+drowned 22.2.1491
    G4. Edzard I, Graf von Ostfriesland (1491-1528), *15.2.1462,+15.2.1528; 
        m. 8.7.1498 Elisabeth Gfn von Rietberg, dau.of GfJohann I von Rietberg 
        by Margarethe zur Lippe (*ca 1475,+13.7.1512)
    H1. Ulrich, Graf von Ostfriesland(1528–32),Valet of Emperor Maximilian I, 
        *1499, +in madness 1532
    H2. Margarete, *1500, +Altenwildungen 15.7.1537; m. Emden 17.2.1523 
        Gf Philipp IV von Waldeck-Wildungen (*1493 +1574)
    H3. Theda, *1502, +1563
    H4. Enno II, Graf von Ostfriesland (1532–40), *VIII.1505,+24.9.1560; 
        m. 6.3.1530 Anna von Oldenburg (*14.11.1501,+10.11.1575)
    H5. Johann, heer van Falkenburg, Durbuy en Halem, *1506 +Schloss 
        Falkenburg 6.6.1572; m. 11.11.1539 Dorothea von Habsburg, heiress 
         of Falkenburg, Durbuy and Halem, illegitimate dau. of Emperor Maximilian I (*1516 +1572)
     I1. Maximilian, heer van Falkenburg, Durbuy en Halem,*1542, +ca 1603; 
         m. 14.9.1564 Barbara de Lalaing
     J1. Christoph, heer van Falkenburg, Durbuy en Halem, +1636
     J2. Dorothea, +1604; m. before 1.4.1592 Jacob t’Serclaes, Gf von 
         Tilly et baron de Marbais (*1564, +11.10.1624)
     J3. Katharina Maria; m. François de Rye, marquis de Varambon
     J4. Louise, *ca 1565, +16.10.1607; m. 5.5.1601 Evrad de Limburg, baron de 
         Barbançon (+31.12.1608)
     I2. Anna; m. Jodocus van Bronckhorst, Gf von Gronsfeld and Limburg 
         (+1588/89)
     I3 Gisela; m. Heinrich van Hahnsberg, Heer van Bruck (+1590)
     H6. Anna, +1530
     H7. Armgard, +1559
     G5. Uko, *1463, +1507
     G6. Almuth, *1465, +1522/23; m. Engelmann von Horstell
     F4. Adda, +ca 1470; m. Weren't Maninga von Bersum (+1450)
     F5. [2m.] Tiadeke, *1438 ?, +after 1470
     E5. [2m.] Doda; m.Reduard Hyetsna, heer van Groothusen
   C2. Sibrand, Captain of Eilsum, +after 1379; m.N von Ilsum (?)
     D1. a son van Eilsum
A2. Merten, +after 1288; m. N von Berum
 B1. Omptat, +after 1310
   C1. Merten, +after 1367/78
     D1. Omptat van Bersum, +after 1378
     D2. Olrik van Bersum, +after 1373
     D3. Bojo
     D4. [parentage uncertain] Tiadeke, +after 1409;1402 m. Affo Beninga von 
      Pilsum Lord of Bersum (+1402)

See also 
List of Counts of East Frisia

Sources

Hobbing, Hans Heinrich (1915). Die Begründung der Erstgeburtsnachfolge im ostfriesischen Grafenhaus der Cirksena. Aurich(Abhandlungen und Vorträge zur Geschichte Ostfrieslands, 19)
Reimers, Heinrich (1925) Ostfriesland bis zum Aussterben seines Fürstenhauses. Bremen
Esselborn, Ernst (1945). Das Geschlecht Cirksena. Berlin

External links 
 

German noble families
 
History of East Frisia